William Benjamin Craig (November 2, 1877 – November 27, 1925) was a U.S. Representative from Alabama.

Born in Selma, Alabama, Craig attended the public and high schools of Selma and was graduated from Cumberland School of Law at Cumberland University, Lebanon, Tennessee.
He was admitted to the bar in 1898 and commenced practice in Selma, Alabama.
He served an apprenticeship as a machinist in the shops of the Southern Railway at Selma from 1893 to 1897.
He served in the Alabama National Guard as a private, noncommissioned officer, and captain.
He served as member of the State senate in 1903–1907.

Craig was elected as a Democrat to the Sixtieth and Sixty-first Congresses (March 4, 1907 – March 3, 1911).
He declined to be a candidate for renomination in 1910.
He resumed the practice of law in Selma, Alabama.
He died in Selma, Alabama, November 27, 1925.
He was interred in Old Live Oak Cemetery.

References

1877 births
1925 deaths
Politicians from Selma, Alabama
Democratic Party members of the United States House of Representatives from Alabama